Archaeological investigation in Delphi started in the second half of the 19th century, but it was not until 1892 when a systematic excavation began under the direction of Théophile Homolle and the French Archaeological School of Athens. The "Great Excavation" (La Grande Fouille) lasted 10 years and was concluded by the creation of the first museum on-site. In the years to follow, the site never ceased to be excavated and investigated. Several of the monuments were restored and new interpretations continue to see the light in the academic field.

The rediscovery of Delphi

In the course of the Ottoman period the archaeological site of Delphi was often visited by European travelers, inspired by the Renaissance spirit. The first one was Cyriacus of Ancona in 1436. The backwater village of Kastri in Phocis became renowned through their descriptions, sketches and engravings. Yet, although the site of ancient Delphi had been securely identified, it was very difficult to start a systematic excavation, as the expropriation of an entire village was almost impossible given the meager finances of the newly founded Greek State.  Some trial sections had taken place in 1840 and 1860 around the polygonal wall. An earthquake in 1870, however, created new hopes. The village was left derelict after it and in 1880 B. Haussoulier managed to start excavating the Stoa of the Athenians.

The Great Excavation
Under Charilaos Trikoupis the Greek state got on the track of modernization and long-term planning. A close collaboration between France and Greece was achieved, part of which was on the field of cultural heritage and archaeology.
Thus, in 1892, under the auspices of the French Archaeological School, started the "Great excavation" (La Grande Fouille). Great, not only in length of time, but also in what regarded the extent, the difficulty, the number of people who were mobilized and, of course, the number and importance of the monuments and finds discovered. The diary of this amazing effort has been digitized by the French Archaeological School at Athens offering a glimpse at the fascinating and copious efforts of the archaeological team, which comprised members of various nationalities.

The entire village of Kastri was transferred to the location where now lies the village of Delphi. The technical teams provided the site with a mini-railway with wagonets, in order to remove the debris, and started demolishing the old houses. After all the preparatory work, the actual excavation started in mid-October 1892, quite late in autumn, and therefore it did not last for long. The next season, however, started in April 1893, revealing large part of the Athenian Treasury as well as the Sibyl rock and the Altar of the Chians. Within the next years came to light most of the buildings along the Sacred Way as well as unique sculptures. One of the most exciting moments was the discovery of the Charioteer, part of the monumental bronze sculpture dedicated by the tyrant of Gela, Polyzalos, in order to commemorate his victory at the Pythian Games. Other highlights of the excavations were the discovery of the Dancers of Delphi as well as of the Roman statue of Antinous and of the pair of archaic kouroi (Dioskouroi or Kleobis and Biton). After revealing the monuments within the sanctuary of Apollo the archaeologists started excavating the stadium and the gymnasium and then moved on to the so-called "Marmaria", i.e. the sanctuary of Athena Pronaia, from where the locals used to pick building material for centuries.

The team of the archaeologists comprised several big names of French scholarship, such as the director Th. Homolle, the architect A. Tournaire, Henri Corvet, P. Perdrizet, and academics such as  Th. Reinach and H. Weil, who undertook the study and enhancement of the epigraphic material. However, it was not a solely French, but rather an international team, as it comprised also scholars of other nationalities, notably Greek and German.

From finds to exhibits: the Museum of Delphi

The inauguration of the first Museum
On 2 May 1903 the Great Excavation was accomplished triumphantly with the inauguration of the Delphi Archaeological Museum, which was going to host the finds. The construction of the museum was enabled by a trust created by the Greek politician and benefactor Andreas Syngros. The inauguration of the museum was an event of international calibre as a number of highly acclaimed personalities in the field of culture and diplomacy were present. The museum was built on croquis designed by the French architect of the excavations Α. Tournaire. The museographic approach of Th. Homolle, based on the use of cast copies of architectural members, in order to demonstrate the sculptures "in context", was soon judged outdated.

The second generation (1903–1939)
In the course of the next thirty years several prominent Greek and foreign archaeologists and researchers worked at Delphi: Keramopoulos, Meliadis and Romaeos,  Van Effenterre,  Jannoray,  Georges Daux and the nobleman Pierre de La Coste-Messelière counted among them. They proposed new identifications and a totally new perspective of the exhibition, which necessitated a remodeling of the museum. They finally started pressing for the creation of a new museum.

The second museum
This museum was inaugurated in 1939. The antiquities were placed according to a chronological order and the plaster casts were removed. This exhibition, however, was going to be a particularly difficult one: the outbreak of World War II led the authorities to have the antiquities buried or to transfer them to Athens. Among these antiquities were the ones discovered on that same year under the Sacred Way, within a dump which had been used in antiquity for burying precious sacred ex votos destroyed by fire or other causes; among these finds counted the Chryselephantine statues, the silver bull, the bronze Pair of athletes and the Incense burner in the form of Peplophoros. The Museum didn't open again until after 1950, because Delphi remained a military zone throughout the Greek Civil War.

The third phase of the Museum
By 1956 it was evident that the Museum needed an extension. The existing building was refurbished and enlarged by the architect Patroclos Karantinos. The new museographic approach was the result of the collaboration of the Ephore of Antiquities of Delphi Ioanna Konstantinou and of Christos Karouzos, director of the National Archaeological Museum. The new Delphi Museum opened its gates in 1961, at the time when the economic and cultural regeneration of Greece started bringing loads of foreign tourists to the site.

The 21st century museum
Finally, one century after the first inauguration of the museum a new exhibition took place, aiming at the enhancement of some of the exhibits, such as the Charioteer and the gold and ivory statues as well as at the compatibility of the museological approach with the new scholarly conclusions stemming from the ongoing study of the objects. As Rozina Kolonia, former Ephor of Antiquities of Delphi, notes in the guidebook of the Museum, the exhibits are displayed in a way that they "compose a historical novel, the pages of which run across twelve centuries of history and archaeology: they narrate through museography the political, religious and artistic activity of the most renowned sanctuary of paganism and of its oracle."

Bibliography
Jacquemin, A. (ed), 2000, Delphes Cent Ans après la Grande fouille. Essai de bilan. Actes du colloque organisé par l'EFA, 17-20 septembre 1992, BCH supplément 36
Kolonia, R., 2006, The archaeological museum of Delphi, Athens
Hellman, M.-C., Skorda, D. (et al.)(1992), La redécouverte de Delphes, Paris

References

Delphi
Delphi
Delphi